Tenfold is the fifth studio album by South African rock band Taxi Violence, released in September 2014.

Reception 
Tenfold received all round positive reviews upon its release.

The first single off the album "Beaten by the Gun" top the local TUKS FM and PUK FM charts. The follow up single "Hit me Up" also topped the TUKS FM charts and PUL FM charts

Track listing

References

2014 albums
Taxi Violence albums